Mikheil Bakhtidze (born 23 September 1988) is a Georgian professional boxer. As an amateur, he won a bronze medal in the super-heavyweight division at the 2011 European Championships.

In 2021 Bakhtidze started his professional career.

Amateur career

International highlights

 2011 – EUBC European Continental Championships (Ankara, Turkey) 3rd place – +91 kg
 1/8: Defeated Marcin Rekowski (Polish) 
 1/4: Defeated Rok Urbanc (Slovenia) PTS 3
 1/2: Lost to Magomed Omarov (Russia) TKO 2
2012 – AIBA European Olympic Qualification Tournament (Trabzon, Turkey) 8th place – +91 kg
 1/8: Lost to Vitalijus Subačius (Lithuania) TKO 1

Professional boxing record

References

External links

Mikheil Bakhtidze at AIBA
Amateur results.

1988 births
Living people
Male boxers from Georgia (country)
Super-heavyweight boxers
Sportspeople from Tbilisi
21st-century people from Georgia (country)